Blood is a 2001 album by the Microphones. It was handmade, and limited to 300 original copies. Included on the album were recordings and alternate versions of songs later found on The Glow Pt. 2, in addition to sound collages, field recordings and other miscellany. Also included was a cover of Björk's "All Is Full of Love".

Track three is significant because of the name it is credited to "the Thunderclouds." The Thunderclouds were a short-lived Beach Boys cover band that featured Phil and his then-girlfriend Khaela Maricich The opening line off of the Microphones album The Glow Pt. 2 is "The thunderclouds broke up.", a reference to not simply the weather but more specifically the ending of the couple's romantic relationship.

Track listing and liner notes

References

The Microphones albums
2001 albums